The Yastreb-class guard ships were built for the Soviet Navy as small patrol and escort ships. Fifteen out of twenty planned ships were laid down before the start of Operation Barbarossa, but only one was completed during World War II. Five others were completed after the war, but five were scrapped on the stocks at Nikolayev when it was captured by the Germans in late 1941, four were scrapped by the Soviets at Leningrad and five were cancelled before they were laid down. The postwar ships were completed to a modified design as Project 29K. One of these was transferred to the NKVD. The last of the ships was scrapped in 1975.

Design
The Yastreb-class guard ships were designed to replace the unsatisfactory  that had preceded them. The Uragans had proven to be too small for the weight of their armament, too slow and bad seaboats because of their excessive top-weight. While almost twice the displacement of the older ships, the Yastrebs had only one additional main gun to minimize the type of stability problems suffered by their predecessors.

General characteristics
The Project 29 ships were longer than their predecessors, at  overall. Their crew increased to 127 men, an increase of 15 men over Yastreb.

Armament
The intended main armament was three single  B-34 guns, protected by gun shields, although some ships reportedly substituted three of the naval version of the  52-K anti-aircraft guns. Four  AA machine guns were also carried. The underwater armament consisted of one triple torpedo tube  mount, fitted between the funnels, and up to 40 mines.

Propulsion

Construction 
The construction of all the Project 29 ships was interrupted by Operation Barbarossa in 1941. Those ships furthest along were suspended for the duration of the war, although Yastreb, as the lead ship of the class, was just over half-complete on 22 June 1941 and was finished at the end of 1944 after the Siege of Leningrad was broken in early 1944. Most of the others were scrapped or canceled. Eleven more ships were intended to be laid down in 1942 and another eight in 1943, but the war ended that plan.

Five other ships had made significant progress before the Germans invaded and were completed to a revised design, Project 29K, after the war. This was slightly larger, added four single  61-K AA guns, and a pair of depth charge throwers in lieu of the mines.

The six ships that were to start construction at the Ordzhonikidze Shipyard in Sevastopol actually had their material prepared at Marti South in Nikolayev and shipped to Sevastopol for building. Similarly the three ships launched, but not completed by the end war, at the Zhandov Shipyard in Leningrad were towed to the former Schichau-Werke shipyard in Kaliningrad for completion.

Ships

Career
Little is known about their careers. Yastreb reportedly became a training ship on 17 February 1956, before becoming a target ship on 31 August 1956 and sold for scrap on 12 September 1959. Orel became a floating barracks on 31 January 1964 before being sold for scrap on 18 September 1969. Korshun may have been transferred to the Border Guards for several years, before being returned to the Navy in 1952. She was sold for scrap 31 January 1964. Zorkii also appears to have been transferred to the Border Guards upon completion before being returned in 1952. She became a training ship on 18 October 1956 and was sold for scrap on 4 November 1975. Burevestnik became a training ship on 17 February 1956 and was sold for scrap on 28 January 1958. Al'batros also became a training ship at the same time and was sold for scrap on 28 February 1961.

Notes

References

External links
 Yastreb class on sovnavy-ww2.by.ru 

Patrol boat classes
Patrol vessels of the Soviet Navy